"Together You and I" is a song by American singer-songwriter Dolly Parton. It was released as the lead single from Parton's 2011 album, Better Day, on May 23, 2011. It impacted country radio on May 27. It peaked at number 67 on the UK Singles Chart. Parton originally wrote the song in the early 1970s and recorded it with Porter Wagoner on their 1974 collaborative album, Porter 'n' Dolly.

Music video
A video for the single was filmed, and was originally scheduled to debut on May 28. However, for unknown reasons, the video was delayed and later debuted on July 4 on country music video station, CMT. The video was directed by Trey Fanjoy.

Live performances
Dolly Parton performed her song on September 10, 2011 on the Launch Night for the ninth series of Strictly Come Dancing. She also performed the song on American television talk show The Ellen DeGeneres Show on May 27, 2011 and on NBC's The Tonight Show with Jay Leno.

Chart performance
The song reached No. 67 in the UK Singles Chart, becoming her highest chart entry since "9 to 5" in 1981.

Release history

References

2011 singles
Dolly Parton songs
Songs written by Dolly Parton
1974 songs
Music videos directed by Trey Fanjoy